Mao Tan-yun (1912 – 5 March 2012) was a Chinese educator and politician. She was among the first group of women elected to the Legislative Yuan in 1948.

Biography
Mao was born in 1912. Originally from Changsha County in Hunan Province, she attended , after which she worked as a teacher and served as head of Suiyuan Girls' Vocational School. She joined the Kuomintang and became chair of the women's section in Suiyuan Province.

In the 1948 elections to the Legislative Yuan, Mao was a Kuomintang candidate in Suiyuan and was elected to parliament. She relocated to Taiwan during the Chinese Civil War, where she became a committee member of the Institute of Revolutionary Practice. She died in 2012.

References

1912 births
Chinese schoolteachers
Members of the Kuomintang
20th-century Chinese women politicians
Members of the 1st Legislative Yuan
Members of the 1st Legislative Yuan in Taiwan
2012 deaths